Finland women's under-19 national floorball team is the national women's floorball team of Finland. , the team was ranked first by the International Floorball Federation.

References 

Women's national under-19 floorball teams
Floorball
National team